Matías Andrés del Solar Goldsmith (born 29 November 1975), known as Matías del Solar, is a Chilean sailor. He competed at the 2004, 2008 and 2012 Summer Olympics in the Men's Laser class.

Notes

References

External links
 
 
 

1975 births
Living people
Chilean male sailors (sport)
Olympic sailors of Chile
Sailors at the 2004 Summer Olympics – Laser
Sailors at the 2008 Summer Olympics – Laser
Sailors at the 2012 Summer Olympics – Laser
Sailors at the 2016 Summer Olympics – Laser
Pan American Games medalists in sailing
Pan American Games silver medalists for Chile
Pan American Games bronze medalists for Chile
Sailors at the 2003 Pan American Games
Sailors at the 2011 Pan American Games
Sailors at the 2015 Pan American Games
Medalists at the 2003 Pan American Games
Medalists at the 2011 Pan American Games